The National Union of Railwaymen was a trade union of railway workers in the United Kingdom. The largest railway workers' union in the country, it was influential in the national trade union movement.

History

The NUR was an industrial union founded in 1913 by the merger of the Amalgamated Society of Railway Servants (founded 1872), the United Pointsmen and Signalmen's Society (founded 1880) and the General Railway Workers' Union (founded 1889).

The NUR represented the majority of railway workers, but not white-collar workers, who were members of the Railway Clerks' Association (founded 1897, later the Transport Salaried Staffs' Association). NUR membership was open to drivers and firemen but most chose instead to be members of the Associated Society of Locomotive Engineers and Firemen (founded 1880).

In 1914 the NUR joined forces with the National Transport Workers' Federation and Mining Federation of Great Britain to form the Triple Alliance – perhaps an unfortunate name, as the same year the Triple Entente of Britain, France and Russia and the Triple Alliance of Germany, and Austria-Hungary (albeit without Italy) went to war.

In 1919 the NUR and ASLEF jointly organised the 1919 United Kingdom railway strike, which prevented a proposed wage reduction and won an eight-hour maximum working day. The NUR formed Federation agreements with ASLEF in 1903 and 1982 but both were short-lived.

The NUR had 408,900 members in 1945, making it the fifth largest union in Britain. Its membership fell to 369,400 in 1956 and 227,800 in 1966.

Following the formation of British Rail, the majority of NUR members worked for the nationalised organisation.  However, other members worked for London Transport, the National Freight Corporation and various smaller companies.  It also recruited British Rail workers in associated industries, such as its hotels, docks and harbours, and on the Sealink ferries.

In 1990 the NUR merged with the National Union of Seamen to form the National Union of Rail, Maritime and Transport Workers (RMT) and ceased to exist as a separate union.

Election results
The union sponsored numerous Labour Party Parliamentary candidates, many of whom won election.

Leadership

General Secretaries

1913: James Edwin Williams
1916: James Henry Thomas
1931: Charlie Cramp
1933: John Marchbank
1943: John Benstead
1948: Jim Figgins
1953: Jim Campbell
1957: Sidney Greene
1975: Sidney Weighell
1983: Jimmy Knapp

Presidents
1913: Albert Bellamy
1918: Charlie Cramp
1920: William James Abraham
1922: John Marchbank
1925: William Dobbie
1928: J. Gore
1931: William Dobbie
1934: Joseph Henderson
1937: Walter T. Griffiths
1939: J. H. Potts
1942: Frederick Burrows
1945: Eddie Binks
1948: William Tindall Potter
1951: Harry Franklin
1954: Jim Stafford
1957: Tom Hollywood
1958: Charles W. Evans
1961: Bill Rathbone
1964: Frank Donlon
1967: Frank Lane
1970: George Chambers
1972: Harold McRitchie
1975: Dave Bowman
1978: Alun Rees.
1982: Tom Ham
1984: George Wakenshaw
1987: Alan Foster
1990: John Cogger

See also

 History of trade unions in the United Kingdom

References

Sources and further reading

 Bagwell, Philip. "Transport" in Chris Wrigley, ed. A History of British industrial relations, 1875-1914 (Univ of Massachusetts Press, 1982), pp. 230–52.

External links

Catalogue of the NUR archives, held at the Modern Records Centre, University of Warwick

 
Defunct trade unions of the United Kingdom
Railway unions in the United Kingdom
1913 establishments in the United Kingdom
Industrial unions
Trade unions established in 1913
Trade unions disestablished in 1990
Defunct transport organisations based in the United Kingdom
Trade unions based in London